"Still Water (Love)" is a 1970 hit single written by Smokey Robinson and Frank Wilson (who also produced the track) for the Motown singing group Four Tops. The B-side was "Still Water (Peace)" and both songs appear on the 1970 album Still Waters Run Deep.

Background

The socially conscious single was a departure from the group's past recordings and produced a smoother sound than the raucous Norman Whitfield productions that belayed on The Temptations. The single features Miracles member Marv Tarplin on guitar and The Andantes adding in additional background vocals shouting out "Still water!". Singers Brenda Joyce Evans and Billie Rae Calvin, brought to Motown by Bobby Taylor (and soon to be part of Norman Whitfield's group The Undisputed Truth), also add backing vocals.  This song was noted for its repeated chord structure, beginning with E-Flat Major, shifting to C Minor, then to B-Flat Major over F, before starting again at E-Flat Major, over and over again, without any changes or alterations to the song's fade.

Chart performance
"Still Water (Love)" went to #4 on the Hot Soul Singles chart,    and to #11 in the US Pop Chart. Outside the US, the song peaked at #10 on the UK Singles Chart.

Cover versions

1979: Terry Callier, Turn to Love.
In 1982, O'Bryan covered the song for his album, Doin' Alright.

References

1970 singles
Songs written by Smokey Robinson
Four Tops songs
Songs written by Frank Wilson (musician)
Motown singles
1970 songs
Song recordings produced by Smokey Robinson
Song recordings produced by Frank Wilson (musician)